"Utopia" is a song performed by Belgian singer-songwriter Tom Dice, released as the lead single from his second studio album Heart for Sale. It was released on 28 February 2012 as a digital download in Belgium on iTunes. The song was written by Jeroen Swinnen, Ashley Hicklin and Tom Eeckhout.

Music video
A teaser for the music video was uploaded to YouTube on 28 February 2012 by SonicAngel.

Track listing

Credits and personnel
 Lead vocals – Tom Dice
 Record producers – Jeroen Swinnen
 Lyrics – Jeroen Swinnen, Ashley Hicklin, Tom Eeckhout
 Label: SonicAngel

Chart performance

Weekly charts

Release history

References

2012 singles
Tom Dice songs
Songs written by Ashley Hicklin
Songs written by Tom Dice
Songs written by Jeroen Swinnen
2011 songs